Hastings Saxons were a British motorcycle speedway team which operated for two years between 1948 and 1949 at the Pilot Field in Hastings.

History

At the end of 1947, the Eastbourne Eagles were forced to close down due to a petrol ban enforced at their Arlington Stadium. They decided to transfer their team to Hastings and at the beginning of 1948 the Speedway Control Board granted a licence to Hastings to stage speedway. They entered the National League Division Three under the management of ex-Wimbledon rider Charles Dugard. In their first meeting at their track at Pilot Field, approximately 5,000 people saw Hastings beat Stoke 44–39.

Hastings finished the 1948 league season in a mid table position in sixth place. They completed the 1949 season in a similar mid table position (8th). At the end of 1949, Hastings were forced to close after a group residents living near to the track took legal action to prevent further racing. The residents claimed that the noise from the speedway motorcycles was a public nuisance.

Notable riders were Jock Grierson, Ken Middleditch and Wally Green, who went on to race for West Ham in the First Division and was runner up in the 1950 World Final. The Pilot Field is still in use by football team Hastings United.

Season summary

References

External links
Hastings Saxons Website

Sport in Hastings
Defunct British speedway teams
Sport in East Sussex